Trigonocidaridae is a family of echinoderms belonging to the order Camarodonta.

Genera

Genera:
 Arbacina Pomel, 1869
 Asterechinus Mortensen, 1942
 Brochopleurus

References

Camarodonta
Echinoderm families